Gerardo Daniel Ruíz Barragán (born 5 September 1985) is a Mexican professional footballer who plays as a goalkeeper.

References

External links

Ascenso MX Profile

1985 births
Living people
Liga MX players
Atlante F.C. footballers
Association football goalkeepers
Footballers from Mexico City
Mexican footballers